Ilya Klyachko (Russian Илья Романович Клячко, Ilijia Romanovič Kljačko) (1905–1998) was a pianist and piano teacher, professor of Moscow Conservatory. Among his students were: Mikhail Voskresensky, Elena Sorokina, Alexander Bakhchiev, Alexey Parshin, Galina Turkina,  Julia Turkina and many others.

References

1905 births
1998 deaths
Russian classical pianists
Male classical pianists
Moscow Conservatory alumni
Academic staff of Moscow Conservatory
20th-century classical pianists
20th-century Russian male musicians